WRJE (1600 AM) was a radio station licensed to the Dover, Delaware metropolitan area. It first began broadcasting in 1957 under the call sign WKEN. The license was cancelled by the FCC on January 13, 2016 due to the station owner's failure to provide information required by said agency.

History
The station went on the air August 2, 1957 as WKEN. It became WQVL on February 23, 1997, and was renamed WAMS on January 31, 2001. The station was unrelated to WTMC (1380 AM), a radio station in Wilmington which used the WAMS call sign from 1947 to 2000. The call sign was briefly changed to WNRK on March 26, 2002, then reverted to WKEN less than two months later. On July 21, 2002, the call sign was changed to WIBF to match its FM sister station in New Jersey (88.7 FM, now WEHA), which it had been simulcasting. On October 13, 2004, the station reverted to its original call sign WKEN for a third time. The original call sign remained in effect for almost a year until September 28, 2005, when the call sign was again changed to WRJE. The WAMS call sign returned to 1600 AM for a second time on January 11, 2007 and remained until July 10, 2007 when the call sign was changed to the call letters WXXY, again to match its sister station in New Jersey (88.7 FM), which it was once again simulcasting.

By June 2008, the FM station in New Jersey dropped the WXXY-FM call sign for WGMX and dropped the simulcast. By 2009, WXXY was still broadcasting a Gospel music format and had added an FM translator on 98.7 MHz in Dover with the call sign "W254AT". The station branded itself "Praise 98.7". The call sign changed again on May 15, 2009 to WDPZ. On September 7, 2009, the callsign was changed back to WAMS, playing an oldies format; also the frequency changed to 98.3 FM on translator W252CH. It also used translator W286BS/105.1-Milford, Delaware. On April 21, 2011, this station changed its callsign from WAMS to WMHZ. On September 29, 2011, WMHZ changed callsigns back to WAMS. On November 6, 2011, WAMS changed formats from 1980s' music to Gospel music. On November 17, 2011, WAMS changed callsigns back to WRJE. On February 10, 2012 WRJE changed formats to regional Mexican, branded as "Sabrosa Radio".

References

External links
FCC Station Search Details: DWRJE (Facility ID: 21632)
FCC History Cards for WRJE (covering as  1955-1981 as WKEN)

RJE
Radio stations established in 1957
1957 establishments in Delaware
Radio stations disestablished in 2016
2016 disestablishments in Delaware
Defunct radio stations in the United States
RJE
RJE